Eugène Duclos Payan (September 10, 1888 – April 27, 1971) was a Canadian professional ice hockey player. He played with the Montreal Canadiens of the National Hockey Association, from the 1910–11 season through to the 1913–14 season.

On March 2, 1912, he suffered a concussion when he collided with one of the Cleghorn brothers in a 2–1 victory of the Canadiens against the Montreal Wanderers. Alphonse Jetté had to replace him as Eugène became delirious and was taken to a hospital.

References

External links
Eugène Payan at JustSportsStats

1888 births
1971 deaths
Canadian ice hockey centres
Ice hockey people from Quebec
Montreal Canadiens (NHA) players
Sportspeople from Saint-Hyacinthe